The city of Hamilton in Ontario, Canada is home to more than 100 waterfalls and cascades, most of which are on or near the Bruce Trail as it winds through the Niagara Escarpment. Ontario's internationally recognized Niagara Escarpment provides perfect geological conditions for waterfalls to occur, from Tobermory to Niagara Falls.

With its  crest, Webster's Falls is the largest waterfall within the city. Tew's Falls is a  ribbon waterfall, and is the tallest waterfall found in Hamilton. Both Webster's and Tew's are located at the Spencer Gorge / Webster's Falls Conservation Area. Albion Falls was once seriously considered as a possible source of water for Hamilton. Rocks from the Albion Falls area were used in the construction of the Royal Botanical Gardens' Rock Garden.

There used to be more waterfalls in Hamilton than exist today. Many of the waterfalls in central Hamilton slowly vanished as population and construction on Hamilton Mountain increased. As well, in the early years, James Street extended south, but was interrupted by a bog at Hunter Street which eventually (1844) was drained out and graded. Many of Hamilton's main buildings and factories in the north end are built on reclaimed or infilled land, which harmed the drainage of Hamilton and the water ecology of Hamilton Harbour.

Many of the falls in west Hamilton are accessible from the Chedoke Radial Trail. It is built on what was once the route for the Brantford and Hamilton Electric Railway owned by the Cataract Power Light and Traction Company (later Dominion Power and Transmission). The "Five Johns", (John Cameron, John Dickenson (Canadian politician), John Morison Gibson, John Moodie, Sr. and John Sutherland), formed The Cataract Power Co. Ltd. introducing electric power to Hamilton in 1898. On August 25, 1898, power was sent twenty seven miles from DeCew Falls, St. Catharines, using water from the old Welland Canal. New industries, such as the forerunners of the Steel Co. of Canada (Stelco) and Canadian Westinghouse, were attracted here by the cheaper, more efficient power. One time this Company controlled hydro power from Brantford to St. Catharines, including the Hamilton Street Railway and the area's radial lines. Back then the city's nickname was "The Electric City."

There are four waterfall types and they are designated as follows:

 Ribbon – height is notably greater than its crest width; stream forms a thin ribbon of water.
 Classical – height and crest width are nearly equal.
 Curtain – height is notably smaller than its crest width.
 Cascade – vertical drop is broken into a series of steps causing water to cascade down incline.

Some of the criteria used to define a separate Hamilton waterfall include:

On January 1, 2001 the new city of Hamilton was formed from the amalgamation of the Regional Municipality of Hamilton-Wentworth and its six municipalities: Hamilton, Ancaster, Dundas, Flamborough, Glanbrook, and Stoney Creek. Before amalgamation, Hamilton had a population of 331,121 divided into 100 neighbourhoods. The new amalgamated city had 490,268 people in over 200 neighbourhoods.

Waterfalls list
The Hamilton Conservation Authority maintains a web database of the city's waterfalls. The list below comes from that website, which contains 100 waterfalls.

Water Quality Problems 
Many of Hamilton's creeks and waterfalls, especially those in the heavily-urbanized Chedoke and Red Hill creek watersheds, suffer from chronic water quality problems. Much of these systems have been buried in large underground concrete storm sewers that run under neighbourhoods established decades ago atop the Niagara escarpment. Industrial and residential use through the 19th, 20th and 21st centuries have caused, and continue to cause, substantial environmental damage to these watersheds. While the city of Hamilton has invested in wastewater storage tanks and tunnels in recent years, as of 2020, water testing performed by non-governmental monitoring bodies continues to reveal high e. coli counts. While the City of Hamilton's website does state that some waterfalls may be polluted and discourages entering the water around waterfalls, it does not state which ones are polluted, nor does the city test the water at any waterfall locations, since it does not designate them as official swimming areas.

Chedoke Falls and Watershed 
In March 2020, it was revealed that as much as 24 billion litres of untreated wastewater had been leaking into Chedoke creek since at least 2014 due to insufficiencies in Hamilton's sewerage and stormwater management system. Chedoke falls is often listed as one of Hamilton's 10 most popular waterfalls, and visitors can regularly be seen swimming and wading in its waters. The Chedoke creek watershed has seen regular discharges of raw sewage for the past century; today, untreated wastewater is discharged into the river regularly during rainstorms, when the city's Combined Sewer Overflows (CSO's) and a 77 million litre concrete wastewater storage tank are incapable of handling increased water volumes. The storm sewer feeding Chedoke falls has also been plagued by incorrectly-installed sanitary sewer cross-connections from the residential neighbourhoods it runs beneath. The amount of raw sewage flowing into the creek on an ongoing basis is unknown. These problems are compounded by the fact that the Chedoke creek is buried in a series of concrete stormwater-and-overflow sewers for almost all of its length; indeed, Chedoke falls itself flows directly out of a storm sewer outfall, visible from the base of the falls. Other waterfalls in the Chedoke creek watershed include Westcliffe Falls and Princess Falls.

Albion Falls and Watershed 
Albion falls is one of Hamilton's largest waterfalls, and sees a significant volume of visitors during the summertime. All of the water flowing over the falls originates in storm sewers that drain substantial portions of Hamilton's west mountain neighbourhoods. In particular, the Stone Church Rd. Storm Trunk Sewer that drains neighbourhoods on either side of Stone Church Road East, nicknamed the "mountain juggernaut", is the largest known sewer in Canada. Water from upstream of the falls emerges from various sewer outfalls, traverses the Dartnall Rd. off-ramps from the Lincoln M. Alexander Parkway, and proceeds to a pond adjacent to the falls before flowing over the falls themselves. Studies in the early 2000s and 2012 indicated high concentrations of e. coli bacteria in various locations along the Red Hill creek watershed, which Albion falls is a part of. A 2013 study of a Red Hill sub-watershed, the Upper Ottawa Creek, noted high concentrations of chloride, sodium, various heavy metals, phosphorus, and likely contamination from sanitary sewer cross-connections. It remains unknown whether the city has addressed these issues.

Images

See also
List of waterfalls in Canada
Geography of Hamilton, Ontario

References

External links
 Great Lakes waterfalls and beyond (www.gowaterfalling.com)
 Cascades and Waterfalls of Hamilton (www.waterfalls.hamilton.ca)
 Hamilton- "The Waterfall Capital of the World" (www.cityofwaterfalls.ca)
 Hamilton Conservation Authority- Waterfalls (www.conservationhamilton.ca)
 Hamilton Naturalists Club (www.hamiltonnature.org)
 Hamilton Waterfalls- Photo Gallery (www.hamilton.worldweb.com)
 Bruce Trail (www.brucetrail.org)
 Travel the Niagara Escarpment: Parks in the City of Hamilton (www.escarpment.org)
 Vintage Postcards: Waterfalls in and around Hamilton, Ontario

Maps
 Hamilton Waterfall Map PDF. (http://map.hamilton.ca)
 Map: Hamilton Waterfalls (www.hamiltonnature.org)

Video clips
 Hamilton- The City of Waterfalls (www.myhamilton.ca)

Waterfalls

Hamilton, Ontario
Waterfalls